William James Isaac (Q3 1918 – 14 April 1941) was an English professional footballer who played as an inside forward in the Football League for Brighton & Hove Albion.

Personal life
Isaac enlisted in the British Army at the outbreak of the Second World War and served as an instructor in the Royal Artillery with the rank of bombardier. He took part in the Battle of France and was evacuated from Dunkirk, dying of meningitis in Maidstone on 14 April 1941. He was buried in Seghill (Holy Trinity) Churchyard.

Career statistics

References

1918 births
Date of birth missing
1941 deaths
Sportspeople from Tynemouth
Footballers from Tyne and Wear
Association football inside forwards
English footballers
English Football League players
Newcastle United F.C. players
Brighton & Hove Albion F.C. players
Royal Artillery soldiers
British Army personnel killed in World War II
Infectious disease deaths in England
Military personnel from County Durham
Neurological disease deaths in England
Deaths from meningitis
Burials in Northumberland